Career Academy School, Patiala is a higher-secondary co-education private school in the Patiala city of Punjab, India. The school was founded in 2000 and is affiliated to the Central Board of Secondary Education of India. Established under the aegis of Jasbir Kaur Memorial Society the school caters to the students from Nursery to XII. The institution has kindergarten with blend of Canadian curriculum,high tech IT enabled smart google classrooms and specialized coaching in games and evening games facilities.A specialized ESL lab is introduced in the school for individual attention. Personality development sessions about building capacities, nurturing talent, enhancing new skill sets, working on weaknesses, and transforming them into strengths are the regular feature of Career Academy. Soon French language is being introduced. Career Academy counseling sessions by Chairman Arundweep Bhatia is the hallmark of the school. Remedial tutorials are there for removing subject weakness. The school has initiated a new 3D concept of Education blending Spiritual education, Academics and Physical education so as to provide all round development to its students. NCC affiliation to airwing is special feature. Career Academy has international tie up with Mississauga Secondary Academy Ontario opening up international facilities to the students. The school offers scholarships to privileged girl child and deserving students.The school has a committee to look into the matters of Child abuse thereby providing safe and secure environment. We have been with us our revered Director Ms. Kamaljeet Bhatia who has always contributed to upgrade the level of the students and the studies by her dedication not only in India but her contributions are international as she is OCT(Ontario Certified Teacher) in Canada,thereby providing students with global education which is the need of the hour.

References 

Co-educational schools in India
High schools and secondary schools in Patiala
Educational institutions established in 2000
2000 establishments in Punjab, India